The Ferarri Testarossa is an Italian sports car from the 1980s and '90s.

Testarossa or Testa rossa (Italian for redhead) may refer to:

 Ferrari 250 TR (Testa Rossa), an Italian sports car from the 1950s and '60s
 Ferrari Monza 500 TR (Testa Rossa), an Italian race car from 1954
 Fate Testarossa, a fictional character in the anime series Magical Girl Lyrical Nanoha
 Teletha Tessa Testarossa, a fictional character from the light novel, manga, and anime series Full Metal Panic!
 Testarossa (album), a 2016 album by Yoni & Geti
 "Testarossa", a 1992 song by Sir Mix-a-Lot from the album Mack Daddy

See also

 
 "I, Testarossa", a 2016 song by Yoni & Geti off the album Testarossa (album)
 Ferrari TR (set index) aka Testa Rossa, several cars

 Redhead (disambiguation)
 Testa (disambiguation)
 Rossa (disambiguation)